Elling is a 2007 theatre adaptation by Simon Bent of the 2001 film of the same name. It was directed by Paul Miller and produced at the Bush Theatre, London, it then transferred to the  West End at Trafalgar Studios for a Critically acclaimed and near sold out 12 week run, with John Simm in the title role (who was nominated for an Olivier award for best actor) Adrian Bower, Ingrid Lacey, Jonathan Cecil & Keir Charles. 

A completely different (and far less successful) version of the play premiered on Broadway on November 21, 2010 using a completely different cast and director, it closed on November 28, 2010, after 9 performances and 22 previews.  The cast included Brendan Fraser and Denis O'Hare playing the mismatched roommates who deal with common concerns related to friendship, work and women. It also starred Jennifer Coolidge as Reidun, Richard Easton as Alfons, and Jeremy Shamos as Frank.

References

English plays
2007 plays
Plays based on films
West End plays
Broadway plays
Norway in fiction